Adam Jared Brody (born December 15, 1979) is an American actor, writer, musician, and producer. He is known for his breakthrough role as Seth Cohen on the Fox television series The O.C., which premiered in 2003. Brody appeared in films including Mr. & Mrs. Smith (2005), Thank You for Smoking (2005), In the Land of Women (2007), and Jennifer's Body (2009).

In the 2010s, Brody had supporting roles in comedies like Seeking a Friend for the End of the World (2012) and Sleeping with Other People (2015), as well as more serious films like Lovelace (2013). He appeared in a number of television series during this time; he starred in and was a producer of the television series StartUp (2016–2018).

Brody has appeared in the DC superhero film Shazam! (2019) and will appear in its 2023 sequel, in the thriller Ready or Not (2019), and in the film Promising Young Woman (2020). He starred in the indie dramedy The Kid Detective in 2020. In 2022, he was part of the main cast of the Hulu miniseries Fleishman Is in Trouble.

Early life
Brody was born in San Diego, California, to Valerie Jill (née Siefman), a graphic artist, and Mark Alan Brody, an attorney. He has younger twin brothers, Sean and Matthew (born 1985). His parents, both Jewish, are originally from Detroit. Brody had a bar mitzvah ceremony and grew up celebrating Hanukkah.

Brody grew up in suburban San Diego, where he attended Wangenheim Middle School and Scripps Ranch High School and received "poor grades". He spent much of his time surfing, admitting that he "pretty much lived at the beach".

Brody attended community college for one year, dropping out at the age of 19, he then moved to Hollywood to become an actor.

Acting career

After a year of training and auditioning, Brody landed the role of Barry Williams in the television film Growing Up Brady (2000). He also appeared in the Canadian comedy series The Sausage Factory. In 2001, he played a minor role in American Pie 2. Brody's first major role in a television series came in 2002, when he was cast in a recurring role on the comedy-drama series Gilmore Girls, portraying Dave Rygalski, Lane's bandmate and love interest.

In 2003, Brody appeared in the movie Grind and the music video for "Too Bad About Your Girl" by the Donnas. The same year, Brody was cast in his breakout role as Seth Cohen on the teen drama series The O.C.. Brody is reported to have improvised some of the character's comedic dialogue. The role turned him into a teen idol, with the character having been described by the Los Angeles Times as "TV's sexiest geek" and by Time as having "redefined" the screen persona of "unapologetic" nerdiness. Brody was the first male on the cover of Elle Girl.

In 2005, Brody appeared in a supporting role in the film Mr. & Mrs. Smith, and played a Hollywood studio assistant in the film adaptation of Thank You for Smoking (2006). His next film role was in the romantic comedy In the Land of Women (2007). Brody played a writer who returns to his mother's Michigan hometown to take care of his sick grandmother. He did not have to audition for the part, but was almost unable to appear in the film because of scheduling conflicts with the second season of The O.C.; the film's director pushed filming back eight months because he wanted Brody to star. The O.C. ended its run in 2007 after four seasons. Brody had said that he was "not unhappy" with the show's cancellation, and that although he was "fortunate" to be on a successful series, he was also glad to "not be on it for 10 years".

After the end of The O.C. run, Brody turned to a full-time film career. In 2007, Brody appeared in supporting roles in the films Smiley Face and The Ten. In 2009, he starred in Boaz Yakin's drama Death in Love and in Diablo Cody's horror film Jennifer's Body. In 2010, he appeared in Kevin Smith's film Cop Out, and then in The Romantics. In July 2010, it was announced that Brody landed the role of Detective Hoss in Scream 4, released in April 2011. In 2011, Brody voiced Woodie in the MTV animated series Good Vibes. In the same year, Brody appeared in The Oranges.

In January 2012, it was announced that Brody had joined the cast of Lovelace, a biopic about the late 1970s porn star Linda Lovelace, directed by Rob Epstein and Jeffrey Friedman. Brody portrayed Harry Reems. Brody starred in Some Girl(s), which premiered at the 2013 SXSW Festival. He appeared in Life Partners (2014). In 2015, he appeared in Sleeping with Other People and starred as Billy Jones in Direct TV's sitcom Billy and Billie.

In 2016, Brody starred in Sony Crackle's drama series StartUp. Brody played the older version of Jack Dylan Grazer's character in the superhero film Shazam and starred in the thriller Ready or Not, the latter directed by Matt Bettinelli-Olpin and Tyler Gillett for Fox Searchlight. The films were released in April and August 2019, respectively, both to positive reviews. Brody has also appeared as Max Larssen in the eight-part drama Curfew, beginning in February 2019.

Other works

Aside from acting, Brody is credited as a musician and writer; he says that he "writes screenplays and songs during [his] spare time." In 2003, Brody wrote and produced the short film Home Security.

In 2005, Brody, along with Nathaniel Castro, Bret Harrison, and Brad Babinski, formed the Los Angeles-based rock band Big Japan, with Brody as the lead drummer. Big Japan's first release, Music for Dummies, was digitally released through Nightshift Records on August 23, 2005. The four-piece indie band played gigs at pubs and festivals from 2005 to 2007 such as The Knitting Factory, Bamboozle Left, The Roxy, Spaceland, and The Viper Room.

In 2007, Brody, along with Danny Bilson and Paul De Meo, co-wrote a comic book miniseries for DC's Wildstorm Comics titled Red Menace. The limited series had six issues and was collected into a trade paperback. Since 2010, Brody has played the drums in the project band The Shortcoats. They released their first EP, This Time Last Year, on October 4, 2011. Their song, "Morning, Shipwreck," which Brody co-wrote, is featured in the sitcom Ben and Kate and the 2015 film The Meddler.

Personal life
Brody is a secular Jew and is non-religious. He has described himself as being a "faux intellectual" and is a member of the Democratic Party. He has joined voting action campaigns including Swing Left.

In March 2010, Brody met actress Leighton Meester while filming The Oranges in Westchester, New York. They became engaged in November 2013 and married in a private ceremony on February 15, 2014. Their first child, a daughter, was born in 2015. In 2020, the couple revealed they were expecting their second child, a son who was born later that year.

Filmography

Film

Television

Awards and nominations

References

External links

 
 

1979 births
20th-century American male actors
21st-century American male actors
21st-century American male writers
American comics writers
American male film actors
American male screenwriters
American male songwriters
American male television actors
American male voice actors
Film producers from California
Jewish American male actors
Jewish American musicians
Living people
Male actors from San Diego
Musicians from San Diego
People from Carlsbad, California
California Democrats
Secular Jews
Writers from San Diego
20th-century American drummers
American male drummers
21st-century American drummers
Screenwriters from California
20th-century American male musicians
21st-century American male musicians
21st-century American screenwriters
21st-century American Jews